The Firsts Monument is installed along Officers Row in the Vancouver, Washington portion of the Fort Vancouver National Historic Site. The monument, erected by the Washington State Historical Society in 1925, commemorates several "firsts" to occur at Fort Vancouver, within the Washington Territory, including the first military post, school, and sermon delivery.

See also
 1925 in art

References

External links
 

1925 establishments in Washington (state)
Monuments and memorials in Vancouver, Washington
Outdoor sculptures in Vancouver, Washington